Live Free Or Die: America (and the World) on the Brink is a book by Sean Hannity.

Live Free or Die discuses the nature of American freedom, democracy, individualism, and how they reflect to politics of the country and the world.

References 

Books by Sean Hannity
Conservative media in the United States
Books about politics of the United States
Threshold Editions books